Hawassa City Basketball Club is an Ethiopian basketball club from Hawassa. The team plays in the Ethiopian Basketball Premier League.

In October 2019, Hawassa City made their debut in the qualifying tournaments for the Basketball Africa League.

The team was originally scheduled to play in the 2022 BAL Qualifying Tournaments but withdrew.

In African competitions
BAL Qualifiers (2 appearances)
2021 – First round
2022 – Withdrew

References

External links
Facebook page

Basketball teams in Ethiopia
Sidama Region
Road to BAL teams